Asthenoceras is a genus of ammonoid from the Middle Jurassic (Lower Bajocian) with dwarfish, evolute, smooth, compressed, discoidal, strongly keeled shell. Asthenoceras belongs to the Sonniniidae and may be a subgenus of the Lower Jurassic (Upper Toarcian) Grammoceras.

References

Ammonitida genera
Sonniniidae
Jurassic ammonites
Fossils of Morocco
Bajocian life